Mohamed Omar Eymoy is a Somali politician. He is the former Minister of Labour and Social Affairs of Somalia, having been appointed to the position on 12 January 2015 by the former Prime Minister Omar Abdirashid Ali Sharmarke. However, he only served  2 weeks when on 17 January 2015, Prime Minister Sharmarke dissolved his newly nominated cabinet due to vehement opposition by legislators, who rejected the reappointment of certain former ministers. On 27 January 2015, Sharmarke appointed a new, smaller 20 minister cabinet of which Mohamed Omar Eymoy was replaced by Mohamed Omar Arte. On 6 February, Sharmarke finalized his cabinet, consisting of 26 ministers, 14 state ministers, and 26 deputy ministers of which Mohamed Omar Eymoy was reinstated but was now the Minister of Fisheries and Marine Resources. He has now been succeeded by Abdirahman Mohamed Abdi Hashi.

References

Living people
Government ministers of Somalia
Year of birth missing (living people)